Louise Arthemise d'Aubigné (commonly known as Madame de Villette; 1584 – Mursay, 24 January 1663) was a daughter of Agrippa d'Aubigné and Suzanne de Lusignan de Lezay.

On 22 October 1610 in Maillezais, she married Benjamin de Valois, Lord of Villette (1582–1661). They had four children:

Madeleine (1621), married in 1649 Hélie, Marquis de Sainte-Hermine.
Aymée (1623), married in 1658 René Jouslard de Fontmort. 
Philippe, Marquis de Villette-Mursay (1627–1707), vice-admiral who was highly successful in the Battle of Beachy Head. 
Marie (1633), married in 1659 Marc-Louis de Caumont d’Adde.

She also raised her niece, Françoise d'Aubigné, the future Marquise de Maintenon and second wife of King Louis XIV. She tried to convert Françoise to the Calvinist Reformed Church of France, but this was prevented by her niece's godmother, Madame de Neuillant.

References 

17th-century French nobility
1584 births
1663 deaths
House of Aubigné
Huguenots